Esporte Clube Vitória, commonly referred to as Vitória, is a Brazilian professional club based in Salvador, Bahia founded on 13 May 1899. It competes in the Campeonato Brasileiro Série B, the second tier of Brazilian football, as well as in the Campeonato Baiano, the top flight of the Bahia state football league.

Vitória's home games are played at the club's own stadium, Manoel Barradas, capacity 35,632. The team plays in red and black horizontal striped shirts, black shorts and black socks. The stripes have changed over time: they have been sometimes vertical, horizontal, wide and narrow.

The youth system of the club is one of the most successful of the world, holding, between 1995 and 2000, at its peak, at least 21 international titles. Recent names that started playing in the club are Bebeto, Vampeta, Dida, Júnior, Hulk, David Luiz, Dudu Cearense, Marcelo Moreno, Gabriel Paulista and others.

The rivals of Vitória are Esporte Clube Bahia. Their matches are known as Ba–Vi ("Ba" from Esporte Clube Bahia and "Vi" from Esporte Clube Vitória). It is one of the most intense rivalries in the country.

History
The club was founded on May 13, 1899, by the brothers Artur and Artêmio Valente, along with seventeen other young fellows. They were from an old Bahia family, and discovered football during their studies in England. Initially Vitória was a cricket club, named Club de Cricket Victoria, because all of them lived at the Vitória neighborhood, in Salvador.

On May 22, 1901, Vitória played its first football match, at Campo da Pólvora, against International Sport Club, a team whose players were English seamen. Vitória beat International 3–2. Two months after that match, Vitória changed its original colors, which were black and white, to red and black, which are still in use.

On September 13, 1903, Vitória beat a club formed by people from São Paulo state, São Paulo Bahia Football Club 2–0 in the club's first official match. In 1908, Vitória won its first title ever, the Campeonato Baiano. They won the next year as well.

From 1910 to 1952, they didn't win any titles because they were still an amateur club. In 1953, the club turned professional, and won its third Baiano honor. Bahia was dominating the state championship, and Vitória only won titles in 1955, 1957, 1964, 1965, 1972, 1980, 1985 and 1989.

The club was runner-up in the 1993 Campeonato Brasileiro Série A to Palmeiras, with an extremely small payroll. Vitória was champion of Bahia in 1990, 1992, 1995, 1996, 1997, 1999 and 2000, becoming the top club of the state for the first time. In the 1999 Campeonato Brasileiro Série A, Vitória reached the semifinals.

In the 2000s, the Campeonato Baiano trophy was won by Vitória eight out of ten years.

In 2004 Vitória, after a poor campaign, was relegated to the Brazilian Second Division. In 2005, the club competed in the Brazilian second division, finishing 17th, and so was relegated to the Third Division for the first time in its history.

In 2006, Vitória was runner-up of the third division, and was promoted to the Brazilian second division. In 2007, the club was promoted back to the first division after finishing in fourth place. This meant the club had managed to return from the lowest Brazilian national division to its original place in the first division in only two years.

In February 2018 the intense rivalry between Vitória and Esporte Clube Bahia drew international attention when ten players (five from each team) were shown the red card in a State Championship match.

Mascot
The club's mascot is a lion named Lelê Leão (Lion), and according to Vitória's official site, his objective is to stimulate the club's supporters and players on match days.

Competitions record
The competitions record of Vitória's last ten seasons:
 Champion.
 Runner-up.
 Promoted.
 Relegated.

Colours
Many kinds of shirts have been worn by Vitória's players over the years.

Current squad

Out on loan

Honours
 Torneio José Américo de Almeida Filho
 Winner (1): 1976

 Copa do Nordeste
 Winners (4): 1997, 1999, 2003, 2010

 Campeonato Baiano
 Winners (29): 1908, 1909, 1953, 1955, 1957, 1964, 1965, 1972, 1980, 1985, 1989, 1990, 1992, 1995, 1996, 1997, 1999, 2000, 2002, 2003, 2004, 2005, 2007, 2008, 2009, 2010, 2013, 2016, 2017

References

External links

 
 Vitória on Globo Esporte

Esporte Clube Vitória
Association football clubs established in 1899
Football clubs in Bahia
Football clubs in Brazil
Salvador, Bahia
1899 establishments in Brazil